The 2004-05 First Division season was the 27th of the amateur  competition of the first-tier football in Guinea-Bissau.  The tournament was organized by the Football Federation of Guinea-Bissau.  The season began on 27 November 2004 and finished on 21 May 2005, this was their next in two years.  SC de Bissau won their twelfth title and finished with 42 points and to financial reasons did not qualify and competed in the 2006 CAF Champions League the following season. As SC Bissau won the 2005 Guinea-Bissau Cup, the second placed club did not participate in the 2006 CAF Confederation Cup the following season also to financial concerns.

Originally a 22 match season and would be 232, three later matches were cancelled and reduced its number to 228.

SC de Bissau was the defending team of the title. SC Bissau finished with 45 points and also scored the most goals and numbered 40.
5

Participating clubs

 Sporting Clube de Bissau
 Bula Futebol Clube
Sport Portos de Bissau - Promoted from the Second Division
 Sport Bissau e Benfica
 Atlético Clube de Bissorã
 Desportivo de Nhacra - Promoted from the Second Division

 Sporting Clube de Bafatá
 Futebol Clube de Cantchungo
 Mavegro Futebol Clube
 Desportivo de Gabú - Promoted from the Second Division
 Estrela Negra de Bolama - Promu de Segunda Divisião
 CF Os Balantas

Overview
The league was contested by 12 teams with SC de Bissau winning the championship.

League standings

See also
Campeonato Nacional da Guiné-Bissau

Footnotes

External links
Historic results at rsssf.org

Guinea-Bissau
Football in Guinea-Bissau